USS Fort Hindman was a steamer acquired  by the Union Navy during the American Civil War. She was placed in service and used by the Navy to patrol navigable waterways of the Confederacy to prevent the South from trading with other countries.

Assigned to the Mississippi Squadron 

Fort Hindman, a side wheel steamer, was purchased 14 March 1863 as James Thompson; she was converted into a river gunboat by the addition of timber bulwarks and thin iron plate: a style of warship commonly referred to as a "tinclad". She joined the Mississippi Squadron in April 1863, Acting Volunteer Lieutenant Thomas O. Selfridge, Jr. in command; was renamed Manitou 23 March 1863; and renamed Fort Hindman 8 November 1863. The USS Fort Hindman was designed to patrol in shallow waters and small tributaries where heavier ironclads could not enter. Her light armor was only intended to stop small arms fire.

Patrolling the Mississippi and adjacent rivers 
 
In July 1863, the steamer headed an expedition up the Little Red River, a tributary of the Black River, and captured quantities of ordnance and Confederate Government provisions, as well as the heavier Federal ironclad Louisville.

She continued to patrol the central Mississippi River and its tributaries, taking a Confederate merchantman prize in the Red River 1 March, engaging Confederate sharpshooters and a battery ashore in the Black and later that day in the Ouachita River. During the expedition, Fort Hindman transported troops and prisoners of war, over and over again engaged Confederate batteries, and took part in the passage of the falls off Alexandria, Louisiana, on 8 May.
 
Moving to a more southerly patrol area, Fort Hindman operated in the rivers and bayous of Louisiana, occasionally returning to Natchez, Mississippi.

Post-war decommissioning and sale 

She arrived at Mound City, Illinois, 1 August 1865. There she was decommissioned 3 August 1865, and sold 17 August 1865.

See also 

 Blockade runners of the American Civil War
 Union Navy
 Confederate States Navy

References

External links 
 USS Fort Hindman (1863-1865, "Tinclad" # 13).

Ships of the Union Navy
Steamships of the United States Navy
Gunboats of the United States Navy
American Civil War patrol vessels of the United States
1862 ships